Tubrow Kapeon Yentu was a Ghanaian politician. He was the member of parliament for the Frafra East constituency from 1954 to 1965 and the member of parliament for the Nabdam constituency from 1965 to 1966.

Yentu was a member of the Northern People's Party (NPP) and consequently a member of the United Party (UP) when all other parties with exception of the Convention People's Party (CPP) merged to form the United Party in 1957. He however, crossed carpets together with Mumuni Bawumia and Mahama Tampurie in 1958 to join the then ruling party; the Convention People's Party.

See also
 List of MLAs elected in the 1954 Gold Coast legislative election
 List of MLAs elected in the 1956 Gold Coast legislative election
 List of MPs elected in the 1965 Ghanaian parliamentary election

References

Date of birth missing
Date of death missing
Ghanaian MPs 1954–1956
Ghanaian MPs 1956–1965
Ghanaian MPs 1965–1966
Convention People's Party (Ghana) politicians
20th-century Ghanaian politicians